The PDM amphibious mines are series of Soviet anti-vehicle mines that could be used on or in beaches, rivers, lakes and shallow coastal waters up to five meters deep.

PDM-1
The PDM-1 has a hemispherical steel case, which is anchored to a heavy steel base. It is normally deployed in water one or two meters deep, and has a central fixing point for a tilt rod. Two men can lay a single mine in 10 to 20 minutes. The mine uses a VPDM-1M tilt rod fuse with an MD-10 detonator.

PDM-1M
The PDM-1M is almost identical to the PDM-1 only having a booster charge to ensure detonation.

Bulgarian PDM-1M
A Bulgarian version of the PDM-1M exists that is substantially developed from the original it uses a plastic cased mine, with a concrete base and a programmable fuse. The fuse can either be of the  electro-mechanical tilt rod type, or a magnetic influence fuse. All the fuzes incorporate a 15-minute arming delay. The mine can self-neutralize or self-destruct after a programmed period of between 1 and 45 days.

The mine can be mechanically laid and recovered, and can operate in 0.8 to 2 meters of water.

PDM-2
The PDM-2 has a spherical case. The mine has a large base plate, which it is fixed to by a pole, and four suspension wires. It uses a VPDM-2 tilt rod fuse, and can be used in water from 2.4 to 3.8 meters deep.

Bulgarian PDM-2M
The PDM-2M is a Bulgarian mine - it uses a similar fuzing system to the Bulgarian PDM-1M, but incorporates a much larger main charge.

PDM-6
The PDM-6 is similar to the PDM-1M, except that it fitted with a secondary fuse well for an anti-handling device on the base, as well as three fuse wells on the top for tilt rod fuzes. The tilt fuzes can be set for contact detonation or to trigger once they reach a certain deflection.

Specifications

References
 Jane's Mines and Mine Clearance 2005-2006
 

Anti-tank mines